Lincoln Hill is a neighborhood in Syracuse, New York.

Borders
James Street is the northern border of Lincoln Hill, where it borders the Sedgwick Neighborhood. The western border streets are Sedgwick Street and Elm Street, where the neighborhood borders the Near Northeast Neighborhood. The southern border is Interstate 690, south of which lies the Near Eastside Neighborhood. Lincoln Hill's eastern border is Teall Avenue, where it borders Eastwood.

Primary Characteristics
Located in the near northeast section of
Syracuse, Lincoln Hill is a primarily residential
neighborhood with a mix of single‐family
homes and apartment buildings. There are
several pockets of commercial activity as well.
"The newest vintage neighborhood in
Syracuse," in the past it was part of a larger
neighborhood called "the Vineyard," and this
heritage is reflected in the grapevine motif of
the Lincoln Hill Neighborhood Association's
logo. Although the neighborhood has
identified itself as Lincoln Hill only since the
1980s, its history goes back much further.

Greenspace & Recreation
Lincoln Park dominates the neighborhood. This 19‐acre
neighborhood park features a baseball field, a tennis
court, basketball courts, a swimming pool, and large
wooded area.

Economic Development
The neighborhood is home to several nonprofit organizations along Oak and James Streets and
light commercial businesses along the 690 corridor.

References
http://www.syracuse.ny.us/uploadedFiles/Departments/CommunityDevelopment/Content/Lincoln%20Hill%20from%202010%20Syracuse%20Housing%20Plan.pdf 

Neighborhoods in Syracuse, New York